The Crédito was a local currency started on 1 May 1995 in Bernal, province of Buenos Aires, Argentina, on a garage sale, which was the first of many neighbourhood barter markets (mercados de trueque) that emerged in Argentina during the economic crisis.

The operator of this currency was the Red Global de Clubes de Trueque Multirecíproco (RGT),
literally "Global Network of Multi-Reciprocal Exchange Clubs" or more simply the "Global Exchange Network" (GEN).

The currency started as a Local Exchange Trading Systems (LETS) system but was soon replaced by a number of printed currencies and, after further experimentation with a LETS called nodine (from no dinero, "not money"), finally became the Crédito, a printed currency again.

The RGT was organized as a chaordic network of barter clubs, which had a clientele from a well-educated middle class that had fallen into unemployment during the Argentine recession of the late 1990s.

The clubs of the RGT had no central organ, no central administration and no legislation. Clubs decided for themselves to accept the Créditos of other clubs and not all clubs issued their own Créditos. Clubs that did usually issued between 30 and 50 Créditos per participant. In a later phase some of the clubs joined zones or networks and zones became the issuers of Créditos instead of individual clubs. The chaordic structure allowed the system to grow quickly but also left the system vulnerable to fraud.

The Crédito was an interest-free currency and was pegged to the Argentine peso, which in turn was pegged to the U. S. dollar at the time. An estimated $400 million in goods and services were traded in 2000. A survey conducted by members of the economics department of Harvard University reports a personal exchange rate of about two Créditos for one peso during 2002-2003 by individuals who offered goods or services in both currencies.

By July 2002 the unemployment rate in Argentina was in excess of 20% and approximately 7% of the population participated in the RGT. Argentina had already had a high unemployment rate of about 17% for six years previously.

The system was used all over Argentina and worked reasonably well for a time but, as things worsened in the formal economy, more and more people joined the RGT clubs, and a growing percentage of people spent their Créditos without offering sufficient skills or trade in return. The system suffered
from hyperinflation and from counterfeiting. Between 2002 and 2003 the government made unemployment insurance available to 2.5 million people, compared to 0.2 million people previously, and thereby increased the availability of the peso to the population stratum using the Crédito, which had an 89% preference for Pesos over Créditos.

Other complementary currencies in Argentina at that time were the Patacón, the LECOP and the Argentino. The Argentino was never implemented.

References
  

External links 

Alternative Currencies in Argentina
User-created currencies in Latin America
To Weather Recession, Argentines Revert to Barter
Argentina: The Post-Money Economy

Currencies of Argentina
Local currencies